FC Krymteplytsia Molodizhne was a football club based in an urbanized settlement (town) Molodizhne (north of Simferopol and adjacent to the city limits). The club's name means "Crimea greenhouse", as the club was founded by entrepreneur Alexander Vasiliev, general director of the agriculture company of the same name.

History
The club played its home games in Simferopol in the town of Ahrarne which is located within the limits of the city. In the championship of the Crimea, the club is represented by its second team "Spartak Molodizhne".

In the 2006–07 season they competed in the Ukrainian First League.

At the end of the 2012–13 Ukrainian First League season the club's administration withdrew the club from the professional league. Since 2013 Krymteplytsia participates at the regional competitions only.

In 2016 it joined the Crimean Premier League.

The club withdrew from the league in 2021 due to funding issues.

Their main colours were red and white, due to chairman Vasiliev being an FC Spartak Moskva supporter, and green, from the company colours of Krymteplytsia.

Honours

Crimean Premier League (1st Crimean Tier)
  2016–17, 2019–20
  2018–19
CFU Cup (National Cup)
  2017–18, 2019–20
  2016–17
Ukrainian Second League (3rd Ukrainian Tier)
  2004–05 (Gr. B)
Crimea regional championship (Lower League Tier)
  2002, 2015–16

League and cup history

Ukraine
{|class="wikitable"
|-bgcolor="#efefef"
! Season
! Div.
! Pos.
! Pl.
! W
! D
! L
! GS
! GA
! P
!Domestic Cup
!colspan=2|Europe
!Notes
|- align=center bgcolor=SteelBlue
|align=center|2002
|align=center|5th Crimean Championship
|align=center colspan=8|...
|align=center|Amateur Cup
|align=center|
|align=center|
|align=center bgcolor=lightgreen|Admitted to Amateur League
|- bgcolor=SteelBlue
|align=center|2003
|align=center|4th Amateur League Gr. E
|align=center bgcolor=silver|2/5
|align=center|8
|align=center|4
|align=center|2
|align=center|2
|align=center|9
|align=center|5
|align=center|14
|align=center|
|align=center|
|align=center|
|align=center bgcolor=lightgreen|Admitted
|- align=center bgcolor=PowderBlue
|align=center|2003–04
|align=center|3rd Second League Gr. B
|align=center bgcolor=tan|3/16
|align=center|30
|align=center|16
|align=center|8
|align=center|6
|align=center|46
|align=center|31
|align=center|56
|align=center| finals
|align=center|
|align=center|
|align=center|
|- bgcolor=PowderBlue
|align=center|2004–05
|align=center|3rd Second League Gr. B
|align=center bgcolor=gold|1/14
|align=center|26
|align=center|20
|align=center|5
|align=center|1
|align=center|51
|align=center|17
|align=center|65
|align=center| finals
|align=center|
|align=center|
|align=center bgcolor=lightgreen|Promoted
|- align=center bgcolor=LightCyan
|align=center|2005–06
|align=center|2nd First League
|align=center|9/18
|align=center|34
|align=center|12
|align=center|11
|align=center|11
|align=center|35
|align=center|34
|align=center|47
|align=center| finals
|align=center|
|align=center|
|align=center|
|- bgcolor=LightCyan
|align=center|2006–07
|align=center|2nd First League
|align=center|4/19
|align=center|36
|align=center|21
|align=center|7
|align=center|8
|align=center|53
|align=center|37
|align=center|70
|align=center| finals
|align=center|
|align=center|
|align=center|
|- bgcolor=LightCyan
|align=center|2007–08
|align=center|2nd First League
|align=center|11/20
|align=center|38
|align=center|13
|align=center|11
|align=center|14
|align=center|49
|align=center|43
|align=center|50
|align=center| finals
|align=center|
|align=center|
|align=center|
|- bgcolor=LightCyan
|align=center|2008–09
|align=center|2nd First League
|align=center|6/17
|align=center|32
|align=center|14
|align=center|7
|align=center|11
|align=center|40
|align=center|39
|align=center|49
|align=center| finals
|align=center|
|align=center|
|align=center|
|- bgcolor=LightCyan
|align=center|2009–10
|align=center|2nd First League
|align=center|6/18
|align=center|34
|align=center|17
|align=center|8
|align=center|9
|align=center|53
|align=center|28
|align=center|59
|align=center| finals
|align=center|
|align=center|
|align=center|
|- bgcolor=LightCyan
|align=center|2010–11
|align=center|2nd First League
|align=center|4/18
|align=center|34
|align=center|18
|align=center|7
|align=center|9
|align=center|43
|align=center|30
|align=center|61
|align=center| finals
|align=center|
|align=center|
|align=center|
|- bgcolor=LightCyan
|align=center|2011–12
|align=center|2nd First League
|align=center|5/18
|align=center|34
|align=center|17
|align=center|9
|align=center|8
|align=center|50
|align=center|38
|align=center|60
|align=center| finals
|align=center|
|align=center|
|align=center| 
|- bgcolor=LightCyan
|align=center|2012–13
|align=center|2nd First League
|align=center|14/18
|align=center|34 	
|align=center|9 	
|align=center|8 	
|align=center|17 	
|align=center|30 	
|align=center|45 	
|align=center|35
|align=center| finals
|align=center|
|align=center|
|align=center bgcolor=lightgrey|Withdrew
|- align=center bgcolor=SteelBlue
|align=center|2014
|align=center|5th Crimean Championship
|align=center|5/16
|align=center|24
|align=center|11
|align=center|3
|align=center|10
|align=center|41
|align=center|31
|align=center|36
|align=center|
|align=center|
|align=center|
|align=center bgcolor=brick|Reorganization of competitions
|}

Crimea
{|class="wikitable"
|-bgcolor="#efefef"
! Season
! Div.
! Pos.
! Pl.
! W
! D
! L
! GS
! GA
! P
!Domestic Cup
!colspan=2|Europe
!Notes
|-
|align=center|2015
|align=center|1st All-Crimean Championship Gr. A
|align=center|9/10
|align=center|9
|align=center|1
|align=center|3
|align=center|5
|align=center|12
|align=center|21
|align=center|6
|align=center|
|align=center|
|align=center|
|align=center bgcolor=brick|Reorganization of competitions
|- align=center bgcolor=LightCyan
|align=center|2015–16
|align=center|2nd Open Championship
|align=center bgcolor=gold|1/16
|align=center|24
|align=center|21
|align=center|1
|align=center|2
|align=center|111
|align=center|17
|align=center|64
|align=center|
|align=center|
|align=center|
|align=center bgcolor=lightgreen|Promoted
|-
|align=center|2016–17 
|align=center|1st Premier League
|align=center bgcolor=silver|2/8
|align=center|28
|align=center|17
|align=center|6
|align=center|5
|align=center|59
|align=center|28
|align=center|57
|align=center bgcolor=silver|Final
|align=center|
|align=center|
|align=center|
|-
|align=center|2017–18 
|align=center|1st Premier League
|align=center|4/8
|align=center|28
|align=center|15
|align=center|5
|align=center|8
|align=center|42
|align=center|28
|align=center|50
|align=center bgcolor=gold|Cup
|align=center|
|align=center|
|align=center|
|-
|align=center|2018–19 
|align=center|1st Premier League
|align=center bgcolor=tan|3/8
|align=center|28
|align=center|13
|align=center|10
|align=center|5
|align=center|44
|align=center|22
|align=center|49
|align=center| finals
|align=center|
|align=center|
|align=center|
|-
|align=center|2019–20 
|align=center|1st Premier League
|align=center bgcolor=silver|2/8
|align=center|28
|align=center|16
|align=center|6
|align=center|6
|align=center|53
|align=center|25
|align=center|54
|align=center bgcolor=gold|Cup
|align=center|
|align=center|
|align=center|
|-
|align=center|2020–21 
|align=center|1st Premier League
|align=center|4/8
|align=center|28
|align=center|12
|align=center|2
|align=center|12
|align=center|47
|align=center|39
|align=center|44
|align=center| finals
|align=center|
|align=center|
|align=center bgcolor=brick|Withdrew
|-
|}

Last squad
, according to official website

Coaches
 ????-2017 Aleksei Khramtsov
 2017– Artur Olenin
 2018 Anton Monakhov
 2018 Andriy Yudin
 2019 Oleh Kolesov

Spartak Molodizhne
The club has own reserve team Spartak Molodizhne (also as Spartak-KT Molodizhne). Spartak defunct in 2018.

The Spartak took part in 2009–10 Ukrainian League Cup where it was eliminated by FC Myr Hornostayivka in quarterfinals.

Honours
 Crimean regional championship (Ukrainian Lower League Tier)
  2007, 2008, 2009

League and cup history

Ukraine
{|class="wikitable"
|-bgcolor="#efefef"
! Season
! Div.
! Pos.
! Pl.
! W
! D
! L
! GS
! GA
! P
!Domestic Cup
!colspan=2|Europe
!Notes
|- bgcolor=SteelBlue
|align=center|2005
|align=center|5th Crimean Championship
|align=center|5/14
|align=center|26
|align=center|15
|align=center|6
|align=center|5
|align=center|60
|align=center|25
|align=center|51
|align=center|
|align=center|
|align=center|
|align=center|as "Krymteplytsia-2"
|- bgcolor=SteelBlue
|align=center|2006
|align=center|5th Crimean Championship
|align=center|12/14
|align=center|26
|align=center|7
|align=center|2
|align=center|17
|align=center|33
|align=center|81
|align=center|23
|align=center|
|align=center|
|align=center|
|align=center|as "Krymteplytsia-Khimik"
|- bgcolor=SteelBlue
|align=center|2007
|align=center|5th Crimean Championship
|align=center bgcolor=gold|1/13
|align=center|24
|align=center|19
|align=center|3
|align=center|2
|align=center|75
|align=center|28
|align=center|60
|align=center|
|align=center|
|align=center|
|align=center|
|- bgcolor=SteelBlue
|align=center|2008
|align=center|5th Crimean Championship
|align=center bgcolor=gold|1/13
|align=center|22
|align=center|19
|align=center|2
|align=center|1
|align=center|87
|align=center|20
|align=center|59
|align=center|
|align=center|
|align=center|
|align=center|
|- bgcolor=SteelBlue
|align=center|2009
|align=center|5th Crimean Championship
|align=center bgcolor=gold|1/12
|align=center|21
|align=center|19
|align=center|1
|align=center|1
|align=center|63
|align=center|18
|align=center|58
|align=center|
|align=center|
|align=center|
|align=center|
|- bgcolor=SteelBlue
|align=center|2010
|align=center|5th Crimean Championship
|align=center|7/12
|align=center|22
|align=center|10
|align=center|3
|align=center|9
|align=center|32
|align=center|34
|align=center|33
|align=center|
|align=center|
|align=center|
|align=center|
|- bgcolor=SteelBlue
|align=center|2011
|align=center|5th Crimean Championship
|align=center|8/13
|align=center|22
|align=center|9
|align=center|2
|align=center|11
|align=center|36
|align=center|42
|align=center|29
|align=center|
|align=center|
|align=center|
|align=center|
|- 
|align=center colspan=14|...
|- bgcolor=SteelBlue
|align=center|2013
|align=center|5th Crimean Championship
|align=center|7/11
|align=center|10
|align=center|5
|align=center|1
|align=center|4
|align=center|15
|align=center|15
|align=center|16
|align=center|
|align=center|
|align=center|
|align=center|
|- bgcolor=SteelBlue
|align=center|2014
|align=center|5th Crimean Championship
|align=center|5/16
|align=center|24
|align=center|11
|align=center|3
|align=center|10
|align=center|41
|align=center|31
|align=center|36
|align=center|
|align=center|
|align=center|
|align=center bgcolor=brick|Reorganization of competitions
|-
|}

Crimea
{|class="wikitable"
|-bgcolor="#efefef"
! Season
! Div.
! Pos.
! Pl.
! W
! D
! L
! GS
! GA
! P
!Domestic Cup
!colspan=2|Europe
!Notes
|- bgcolor=LightCyan
|align=center|2016–17
|align=center|2nd Open Championship
|align=center|5/13
|align=center|23
|align=center|11
|align=center|5
|align=center|7
|align=center|50
|align=center|27
|align=center|38
|align=center|
|align=center|
|align=center|
|align=center|as "Krymteplytsia-2"
|- bgcolor=LightCyan
|align=center|2017–18
|align=center|2nd Open Championship
|align=center|5/13
|align=center|24
|align=center|11
|align=center|5
|align=center|8
|align=center|43
|align=center|33
|align=center|38
|align=center|
|align=center|
|align=center|
|align=center|as "Krymteplytsia-2"
|- bgcolor=LightCyan
|align=center|2018–19
|align=center|2nd Open Championship
|align=center|7/17
|align=center|29
|align=center|13
|align=center|5
|align=center|11
|align=center|63
|align=center|48
|align=center|44
|align=center|
|align=center|
|align=center|
|align=center bgcolor=lightgrey|as "Krymteplytsia-2"; withdrew
|-
|}

References

External links
Official website 

 
Defunct football clubs in Crimea
Association football clubs established in 1999
Association football clubs disestablished in 2021
1999 establishments in Ukraine
2021 disestablishments in Russia